Siemens EDA is a US-based electronic design automation (EDA) multinational corporation for electrical engineering and electronics, headquartered in Wilsonville, Oregon. Founded in 1981 as Mentor Graphics, the company was acquired by Siemens in 2017.

The company distributes products that assist in electronic design automation, simulation tools for analog mixed-signal design, VPN solutions, and fluid dynamics and heat transfer tools. The company leveraged Apollo Computer workstations to differentiate itself within the computer-aided engineering (CAE) market with its software and hardware.

History 
Siemens EDA was founded as Mentor Graphics in 1981 by Tom Bruggere, Gerry Langeler, and Dave Moffenbeier, all formerly of Tektronix. The company raised $55 million in funding through an initial public offering in 1984. 

Mentor initially wrote software that ran only in Apollo workstations. 

When Mentor entered the CAE market the company had two technical differentiators: the first was the software  Mentor, Valid, and Daisy each had software with different strengths and weaknesses.  The second, was the hardware  Mentor ran all programs on the Apollo workstation, while Daisy and Valid each built their own hardware. By the late 1980s, all EDA companies abandoned proprietary hardware in favor of workstations manufactured by companies such as Apollo and Sun Microsystems.

After a frenzied development, the IDEA 1000 product was introduced at the 1982 Design Automation Conference, though in a suite and not on the floor.

Mentor Graphics was purchased by Siemens in 2017. The name was retired in 2021 and renamed Siemens EDA.

Acquisitions

Timeline

Related 

 In June 2008, Cadence Design Systems offered to acquire Mentor Graphics in a leveraged buyout. On 15 August 2008, Cadence withdrew this offer quoting an inability to raise the necessary capital and the unwillingness of Mentor Graphics' Board and management to discuss the offer. 
In February 2011, activist investor Carl Icahn offered to buy the company for about $1.86 billion in cash.
In November 2016, Mentor Graphics announced that it was to be acquired by Siemens for $4.5 billion, at $37.25 per share, a 21% premium on Mentor's closing price on the previous Friday. The acquisition was completed in March 2017. Mentor Graphics started to operate as "Mentor, a Siemens Business". Under the terms of the acquisition, Mentor Graphics kept its headquarters in Wilsonville with workforce intact, and operated as an independent subsidiary.
In January 2021, Mentor became a division of Siemens and was renamed as Siemens EDA.

Locations 
Mentor product development was located in the US, Taiwan, Egypt, Poland, Hungary, Japan, France, Canada, Pakistan, UK, Armenia, India and Russia.

Products 

Mentor offered the following tools:

Electronic design automation 
Integrated circuit layout full-custom and schematic-driven layout (SDL) tools such as IC Station or  Memory Builder, a first industry tool for rapid embedded memory design that helped to develop single- or dual-port RAMs (synchronous and asynchronous), as well as diffusion and metal read only memories (ROM)
IC place and route tool: Aprisa
IC Verification tools such as Calibre nmDRC, Calibre nmLVS, Calibre xRC, Calibre xACT 3D
 IC Design for Manufacturing tools such as Calibre LFD, Calibre YieldEnhancer, Calibre, and YieldAnalyzer
Schematic capture editors for electronic schematics such as Xpedition Designer
Layout and design tools for printed circuit boards with programs such as PADS, Xpedition Layout, HyperLynx and Valor NPI
Component library management tools
IP cores for ASIC and FPGA designs

Embedded systems 
Mentor Embedded Linux for ARM, MIPS, Power, and x86 architecture processors
Real-time operating systems:
Nucleus OS (acquired in 2002 when Mentor acquired Accelerated Technology, Inc.)
VRTX (acquired in 1995 when Mentor bought Microtec Research)
AUTOSAR implementation:
Embedded implementation VSTAR in part acquired from Mecel in 2013
Configuration tooling Volcano Vehicle Systems Builder (VSB)
Development Tools:
Sourcery CodeBench and Sourcery GNU toolchains (acquired in 2010 when Mentor acquired CodeSourcery)
Inflexion UI  (Next Device was acquired by Mentor in 2006)
xtUML Design Tools: BridgePoint (acquired in 2004 when Mentor acquired Project Technology)
VPN Solutions:
Nucleus Point-to-Point Tunneling Protocol (PPTP) software
Nucleus NET networking stack
Nucleus implementation of the Microsoft Point-to-Point Encryption (MPPE) protocol
Nucleus PPP software

FPGA synthesis 
Precision Synthesis  Advanced RTL & physical synthesis for FPGAs

Electrical systems, cabling, and harness 
Capital  a suite of integrated tools for the design, validation and manufacture of electrical systems and harnesses
VeSys  a mid-market toolset for vehicle electrical system and harness design

Simulation 
ModelSim is a hardware simulation and debug environment primarily targeted at smaller ASIC and FPGA design
QuestaSim is a simulator with advanced debug capabilities targeted at complex FPGA's and SoC's. QuestaSim can be used by users who have experience with ModelSim as it shares most of the common debug features and capabilities. One of the main differences between QuestaSim and Modelsim (besides performance/capacity) is that QuestaSim is the simulation engine for the Questa Platform which includes integration of Verification Management, Formal based technologies, Questa Verification IP, Low Power Simulation and Accelerated Coverage Closure technologies. QuestaSim natively supports SystemVerilog for Testbench, UPF, UCIS, OVM/UVM where ModelSim does not.
Eldo is a SPICE simulator
Xpedition AMS is a virtual lab for mechatronic system design and analysis
ADiT is a Fast-SPICE simulator
Questa ADMS is a mixed-signal verification tool

Emulation 

 The Veloce product family enables SoC emulation and transaction-based acceleration.

Mechanical design 
Fluid Dynamics and Heat Transfer tools:
Simcenter Flotherm is a Computational Fluid Dynamics tool dedicated to electronics cooling using parameterized ‘SmartParts’ for common electronic components such as fans, heatsinks, and IC packages.
Simcenter Flotherm XT is an electronics cooling CFD tool incorporating a solid modeler for manipulating MCAD parts.
Simcenter FLOEFD is a ‘design concurrent’ CFD tool for use in early-stage product design and is embedded within MCAD systems such as Solidworks, Creo Elements/Pro, CATIA V5 and Siemens NX.
Thermal Characterization and Thermal Interface Material (TIM) Measurement equipment:
Simcenter T3STER is a hardware product that embodies an implementation of the JEDEC JESD51-1 standard for IC package thermal characterization and is compliant with JESD51-14 for Rth-JC measurement.
Simcenter TERALED provides automation of the CIE 127:2007 standard providing total flux, chromaticity and correlated color temperature (CCT) for power LEDs. With T3Ster it provides thermal resistance metrics for LEDs based on the real dissipated heating power.
Simcenter DYNTIM extends T3Ster, providing a dynamic thermal test station for thermal conductivity measurements of thermal interface materials (TIMs), thermal greases and gap pads.
Simcenter Flomaster is a 1D or system-level CFD solution for analyzing fluid mechanics in complex pipe flow systems (from the acquisition of Flowmaster Ltd in 2012).
CADRA Design Drafting is a 2-1/2D mechanical drafting and documentation package specifically designed for drafting professionals. It provides the tools needed to develop complex drawings quickly and easily (from the acquisition of the CADRA product in 2013).

See also 

List of EDA companies
Comparison of EDA software

References

Companies based in Wilsonville, Oregon
1981 establishments in Oregon
2017 mergers and acquisitions
Electronic design automation companies
Electronics companies established in 1981
Electronics companies of the United States
Siemens
American subsidiaries of foreign companies